The 2017 German Indoor Athletics Championships was the 64th edition of the national championship in indoor track and field for Germany. It was held on 18–19 February at the Arena Leipzig in Leipzig – the seventh time the venue had hosted the championships. Ticketing for the event was sold out. A total of 25 events, 13 for men and 12 for women, were contested plus six further events were held separately. It was to serve as preparation for the 2017 European Athletics Indoor Championships.

Several national championship events were staged elsewhere: 3 × 800 m and 3 × 1000 m relays were held on 26 February at the Glaspalast Sindelfingen in Sindelfingen, while racewalking events were hosted at the Leichtathletikhalle Erfurt in Erfurt on 5 March. Indoor combined events were held at the Leichtathletik-Halle in Hamburg on 28 and 29 January.

Results

Men

Women

References

Results
 Gesamtergebnisse und Rekorde
 Hallen-DM 2017 kompakt: News-Übersicht bei leichtathletik.de

German Indoor Athletics Championships
German Indoor Athletics Championships
German Indoor Athletics Championships
German Indoor Athletics Championships
Sports competitions in Leipzig